Jerzy Juskowiak (3 May 1939 – 10 December 1993) was a Polish sprinter. He competed in the men's 4 × 100 metres relay at the 1960 Summer Olympics.

References

External links
 

1939 births
1993 deaths
Athletes (track and field) at the 1960 Summer Olympics
Polish male sprinters
Olympic athletes of Poland
People from Rawicz County
Sportspeople from Greater Poland Voivodeship
Zawisza Bydgoszcz athletes
20th-century Polish people